Turkville is a ghost town in Ellis County, Kansas, United States.

History
Settlers from Tennessee founded Turkville in 1876. They were Baptists, and they established the first Baptist church in Ellis County. Most were the extended family of their pastor, Rev. Allen King.

Turkville was issued a post office in 1875. The post office was discontinued in 1918. The population in 1910 was 40.

Geography
Turkville is located at  (39.1033441, -99.2456550) at an elevation of 1,837 feet (561 m). It lies on the north bank of the Saline River in the Smoky Hills region of the Great Plains.

Education
The Turkville elementary school was closed in 1967.

Transportation
Saline River Road, an unpaved county road, runs east–west through Turkville.

References

Further reading

External links
 Ellis County maps: Current, Historic, KDOT

Former populated places in Ellis County, Kansas
Former populated places in Kansas